The Legislature of Tierra del Fuego, Antarctica and South Atlantic Islands is the unicameral legislative body of Tierra del Fuego Province, in Argentina. It comprises 15 legislators, elected in a single province-wide multi-member district that encompasses the entirety of the province's territory.

The Legislature was established in 1983, as the legislature of the National Territory of Tierra del Fuego. In 1990, the territory became the 23rd province of Argentina, and the first such legislature was elected in 1991, alongside the first democratically elected governor. Elections to the legislature take place every four years, when the entirety of its members are renewed. The legislature is presided by the Vice Governor of Tierra del Fuego, who is elected alongside the governor every four years.

The legislature formerly convened at the Old Government House, on Maipú Avenue, Ushuaia. Although the old building is still used for ceremonial purposes and as headquarters of the vice governorship, legislative sessions are held in a new building on Yaganes 683, Ushuaia.

Since 2019, the president of the Legislature has been Mónica Urquiza, of the Fueguian People's Movement (MOPOF). Urquiza was elected in the gubernatorial ticket of Gustavo Melella.

References

External links
 
Constitution of Tierra del Fuego, Antarctica and South Atlantic Islands 

1983 establishments in Argentina
Politics of Argentina
Tierra del Fuego Province, Argentina
Tierra del Fuego